Hans Georg Feichtinger (born 16 June 1951) is an Austrian mathematician. He is  Professor in the mathematical faculty of the University of 
Vienna. He is editor-in-chief of the Journal of Fourier Analysis and Applications (JFAA) and associate editor to several other journals. He is one of the founders and head of the Numerical Harmonic Analysis Group (NuHAG) at University of Vienna. Today Feichtinger's main field of research is harmonic analysis with a focus on time-frequency analysis.

Biography
Hans Georg Feichtinger was born in Wiener Neustadt where he graduated from the Gymnasium and received the Matura "summa cum laude" in 1969. In the same year he started his studies in mathematics and physics. He finished his PhD at the University of Vienna in 1974 under the supervision of Hans Reiter in 1974 with a doctoral thesis on Subalgebras of L1(G). Feichtinger attained professorship with the defense of his habilitation thesis on Banach convolution algebras of functions in 1979. Feichtinger is author or co-author to roughly 200 scientific publications.

The University of Vienna being the center of his scientific life, Feichtinger still had several visiting positions across Europe and in the USA between 1980 and today, e.g. at the University of Maryland, College Park and the University of Connecticut, Storrs. He is married and the father of four children.

The NuHAG (Numerical Harmonic Analysis Group)
In the late 1980s Hans Georg Feichtinger and Karlheinz Gröchenig conducted joint research on atomic decompositions. From 1990 on, Feichtinger investigated irregular sampling and computational harmonic analysis with Thomas Strohmer. These cooperations were the basis for founding the Numerical Harmonic Analysis Group (NuHAG) at the University of Vienna with Feichtinger as group leader. While the research project Experimental Signal Analysis is noted as the starting point of NuHAG several earlier publications and projects are listed to be NuHAG related, the earliest dates back to 1986. Over the years, NuHAG has become a group of international importance in the fields from abstract harmonic analysis to applied time-frequency analysis and currently hosts around 40 researchers (including PhD students).

Dedication to the University of Vienna and the scientific community

Hans Georg Feichtinger is the editor-in-chief of the Journal of Fourier Analysis and Applications taking over from John J. Benedetto in the year 2000, and associate editor to the Journal of Approximation Theory (JAT), the Journal of Function spaces and Applications (JFSA) and Sampling Theory in Signal and Image Processing (STSIP). Furthermore, Feichtinger was for many years the contact person for the European Union's student exchange program LEONARDO at the faculty of mathematics of the University of Vienna and is actively involved in workshops and conferences. Throughout his career Hans G. Feichtinger has supervised 23 completed PhD theses, also today he is advising several students (as of June 2011).

Scientific work

The scientific work of Hans Georg Feichtinger includes, but is not limited to results on function spaces, irregular sampling,
time-frequency analysis, Gabor analysis and frame theory. Some of his most notable contributions are listed below.

In the early 1980s, Feichtinger introduced modulation spaces, a family of function spaces defined by the behavior of the short-time Fourier transform with respect to a test function from the Schwartz space. They have become the standard spaces in time-frequency analysis. Also, while the concept of function spaces treating local and global behavior separately was already known earlier, Wiener amalgam spaces were introduced by Feichtinger in 1980, also his publications have contributed to the acknowledgment of amalgam spaces as a useful tool in various mathematical fields.

Around 1990 the joint research with Karlheinz Gröchenig lead to a series of papers, which is today referred to as coorbit theory. The theory provides a unified framework for different important transforms, e.g. the wavelet transform and the short-time Fourier transform.

Feichtinger also proposed the use of Banach Gelfand triples, especially the Banach Gelfand triple  that has proven very useful, e.g. in time-frequency analysis.

Feichtinger's conjecture

Feichtinger once raised the question, whether
 
Every bounded frame can be written as a finite union of Riesz basic sequences.

The question is now widely referred to as Feichtinger's conjecture, a term first used by Peter G. Casazza.

This question was not only an important open problem in frame theory but was found to be equivalent to the famous and long-open Kadison–Singer problem in analysis (first stated in 1959).

Proofs were known for certain special cases since 2005, and in 2013 an equivalent to the full conjecture was proved by Adam Marcus, Daniel A Spielman and Nikhil Srivastava.

Selected publications

Hans Georg Feichtinger has published approximately 200 scientific articles, a selection of which is presented below (in chronological order):

References

External links 

Hans Georg Feichtinger's homepage at University of Vienna
NuHAG homepage

1951 births
Living people
20th-century Austrian mathematicians
21st-century Austrian  mathematicians
Academic staff of the University of Vienna
University of Vienna alumni